The 2022–23 Biathlon World Cup – Individual Women started on 30 November 2022 in Kontiolahti and will conclude on 9 March 2023 in Östersund.

Competition format 
The individual race is the oldest biathlon event; the distance is skied over five laps. The biathlete shoots four times at any shooting lane, in the order of prone, standing, prone, standing, totalling 20 targets. Competitors' starts are staggered, normally by 30 seconds. The distance skied is usually 20 kilometres (12.4 mi) with a fixed penalty time of one minute per missed target that is added to the skiing time of the biathlete. In the "Short Individual" the distance is 15 kilometres (9.3 mi) with a penalty time of 45 seconds per missed target.

2022–23 Top 3 standings

Events summary

Standings 
Intermediate standings after 2 competitions.

References 

Individual Women